Hunza River is the principal river of Hunza in Gilgit–Baltistan, Pakistan  It is formed by the confluence of the Chapursan and Khunjerab nalas (gorges) which are fed by glaciers. It is joined by the Gilgit River and the Naltar River, before it flows into the Indus River.

The river cuts through the Karakoram range, flowing from north to south. The Karakoram Highway (N-35) runs along the Hunza River valley, switching to the Khunjerab River valley at the point of confluence, eventually reaching the Khunjerab Pass at the border with China Xinjiang.

The river is dammed for part of its route.

The Attabad landslide disaster in January 2010 completely blocked the Hunza Valley. A new lake — now called the Attabad Lake or Gojal Lake —  which extends 30 kilometers and rose to a depth of 400 feet, was formed as the Hunza River backed-up. The landslide completely covered sections of the Karakoram Highway.

The Hunza river is being changed by climate change.

See also
 Hunza Valley
 Nagar Valley

References

External links 
 Gilgit River basin marked on the OpenStreetMap, including the Hunza River basin.

Tributaries of the Indus River
Rivers of Gilgit-Baltistan
Karakoram
Hunza District
Rivers of India